Brooke Frieling (born November 10, 1986) is an American ice dancer who competed for Israel with partner Lionel Rumi.

Career
Early in her career, Frieling skated with Buck Withrow for the United States at the Skating Club of Boston. She later trained for a year at the senior level in San Diego, California.

In early 2008, Frieling moved to Philadelphia to be coached by Natalia Linichuk  and Gennadi Karponosov. She teamed up with Lionel Rumi to compete for Israel. They placed 20th at the 2011 European Championships and 24th at the 2011 World Championships.

Personal life 
Frieling is taking a part-time course load at the University of Pennsylvania.

Competitive highlights

With Withrow

With Rumi

Personal bests

Music

External links
  ISU Biography
  Official Website of Israel Federation
  Official Website of Brooke Frieling and Lionel Rumi

References

1986 births
Living people
Figure skaters from Boston
Israeli female ice dancers
American female ice dancers
21st-century American women
Israeli people of American-Jewish descent